Morville-en-Beauce (literally Morville in Beauce) is a commune in the Loiret department in north-central France. It is located about 12 km north of Pithiviers.

See also
Communes of the Loiret department

References

Morvilleenbeauce